Dmitri Vanyasov (born May 9, 1972) is a Soviet and Russian former professional ice hockey forward. He is a one-time Russian Champion.

Awards and honors

References

External links
Biographical information and career statistics from Eliteprospects.com, or The Internet Hockey Database

1972 births
Living people
Dizel Penza players
HC CSK VVS Samara players
Rubin Tyumen players
Ak Bars Kazan players
HC Neftekhimik Nizhnekamsk players
Torpedo Nizhny Novgorod players
Russian ice hockey forwards